Andrew Wilson (born 27 September 1940) is an English former professional footballer who scored 28 goals from 229 goals in the Football League. A winger, he played for Sheffield United, Scunthorpe United, Doncaster Rovers, Chesterfield and Aldershot.

Career
Wilson was born in Rotherham, Yorkshire. He began his career in the Football League with Sheffield United, joining Scunthorpe United of the Fourth Division in June 1961. He stayed with the club for four seasons, and played more than 100 games, before moving to Doncaster Rovers in 1965 on a free transfer. After a year he moved on to Chesterfield, and after a further two years signed for Aldershot. In 1969, he dropped into non-League football with Boston United.

References

External links
 

1940 births
Living people
Footballers from Rotherham
English footballers
Association football wingers
Sheffield United F.C. players
Scunthorpe United F.C. players
Doncaster Rovers F.C. players
Chesterfield F.C. players
Aldershot F.C. players
Boston United F.C. players
English Football League players